"Girl Come Running" is a song recorded by The Four Seasons and released as a single in 1965. It was composed by group member Bob Gaudio and Bob Crewe. Considered a "minor hit" for the group in context of their string of records reaching the upper levels of the Billboard Hot 100 singles chart, "Girl Come Running" peaked at #30 in July 1965.

Billboard described the single as "powerful production and vocal performance on a good Bob Crewe teen ballad with a driving dance beat in strong support."  Cash Box described it as "one of the [Four Seasons'] most dynamic showings."

References

1965 singles
The Four Seasons (band) songs
Songs written by Bob Gaudio
Songs written by Bob Crewe
Song recordings produced by Bob Crewe
1965 songs
Philips Records singles